Colonia Ofir is a Russian rural settlement in Río Negro Department, Uruguay.

Established in 1966, it is made up of Old Believers, very protective of their religious traditions.

See also
Russians in Uruguay

References

1966 establishments in Uruguay
Populated places established in 1966
Russian immigration to Uruguay
Eastern Orthodoxy in Uruguay
Old Believer communities
History of the Russian Orthodox Church
Populated places in the Río Negro Department
Religion in Río Negro Department